St Peter's (Guernesiais: Saint Pierre), known officially as Saint Pierre du Bois (English: "St. Peter in the Wood") is a parish in Guernsey.  It is the centre for the Guernsey Western Parishes which includes Torteval, St Saviour's and the Forest.

The old Guernesiais nickname for people from Saint Pierre was etcherbaots which means beetles.

The postal code for street addresses in this parish begins with GY7.

St Peter's won the Britain in Bloom small coastal prize in 2015. and a gold medal in the 2016 Champion of Champions competition.

Geography
The parish is located in the West of the Island and has borders with the parishes of Torteval, St. Saviour's, Forest and St. Andrew's.

The parish is mainly countryside with a small village in the centre. The parish church is one of the most unusual in the islands as it is built at the bottom of a small valley and the interior of the church is not flat but diagonal in appearance.

Features

The features of the parish include:
 St Peter's church
 St Peter's village
 Lihou
 Military:
 Parish war memorial outside parish church
 Fort Grey Château du Rocquaine
 Fort Saumarez
 L'Eree Battery
 Mont Herault watchhouse
 Batterie Mirus
 German fortifications, built during the occupation 1940-45
 A number of protected buildings 
 Le Creux es Faies neolithic passage grave can be found on the L'Eree headland. In local folk lore it is said to be one of the entrances to fairy land.
 Beaches
 Rocquaine Bay
 Le Crocq du Sud
 L'Erée (MCS recommended)
 Lihou
 Nature reserves
 Silbe nature reserve 
 Colin Best nature reserve 
 La Claire Mare nature reserve 
 Lihou Island nature reserve
 Abreuvoirs (places for cattle to drink) 

The parish of the Vale hosts:
 St Peter's Douzaine
 Styx community centre
 Countryside walks

Politics
Saint Peter comprises part of the West administrative division with Torteval, St. Saviour's and Forest

In the 2016 Guernsey general election there was a 3,188 or 74% turnout to elect five Deputies. Those elected (in order of votes received) being Al Brouard, Andrea Dudley-Owen, Emilie Yerby, David De Lisle and Shane Langlois.

Notable people
 Sampson Avard, the leader of a band of Mormon vigilantes called the Danites, which existed in Missouri during the period of the 1838 Mormon War.
Harry Lewis, also known as W2S and is a member of the Sidemen.

References

External links
 Parish Website

Peter